Burgess GAA is a Gaelic Athletic Association Club located in the areas of Burgess-Burgessbeg, Youghalarra and Newtown, County Tipperary, Ireland. It fields Gaelic Football and Hurling teams in the North Division of Tipperary GAA.

Hurling

Honours

North Tipperary Senior Hurling Championship (1)
 Youghalarra 1909
Séamus Ó Riain Cup (1)
 2018
North Tipperary Intermediate Hurling Championship (1)
 Youghalarra 1942
North Tipperary Intermediate Hurling Championship (14)
 Burgess 1941, 1951, 1953, 1956, 1959, 1963, 1964, 1969, 1970, 1976, 1992, 1993, 2003, 2005
 Tipperary Junior A Hurling Championship (2)
 1964, 1976
North Tipperary Junior Hurling Championship (2)
 Youghalarra 1909, 1931
North Tipperary Junior Hurling Championship (1)
 Ballywilliam 1918
North Tipperary Junior Hurling (A) Championship (3)
 2003, 2004, 2005
 Tipperary Junior Hurling (B) Championship (1)
 1999
North Tipperary Junior Hurling (B) Championship (3)
 1985, 1991, 1999
North Tipperary Junior Hurling (C) Championship (1)
 2011
North Tipperary U-21 Hurling (A) Championship (6)
 1959, 1970 (with Kildangan as Naomh Padraig), 1971  (with Kildangan as Naomh Padraig), 1999, 2002, 2004, 2011
 Tipperary Under-21 B Hurling Championship (1)
 1998
North Tipperary U-21 Hurling (B) Championship (3)
 1988, 1997, 1998
North Tipperary Minor Hurling (A) Championship (2)
 Youghalarra 1936, 1939 
North Tipperary Minor Hurling (A) Championship (1)
 2002 
 Tipperary Minor Hurling (B) Championship (1)
 1990
North Tipperary Minor Hurling (B) Championship (6)
 1974, 1978, 1986, 1990, 2009, 2011 
Tipperary U-16 Hurling (A) Championship (1) 
 2000
North Tipperary U-16 Hurling (A) Championship (1)
 2000
North Tipperary U-16 Hurling (B) Championship (5)
 1982, 1984, 1990, 1994, 2016
North Tipperary U-14 Hurling (A) Championship (1)
 1999
North Tipperary U-14 Hurling (B) Championship (7)
 1984, 1985, 1994, 1995, 1996, 2015, 2019
North Tipperary U-12 Hurling (A) Championship (1)
 2004
North Tipperary U-12 Hurling (B) Championship (4)
 1980, 1986, 1994, 2018
North Tipperary U-12 Hurling (C) Championship (3)
 1991, 2011, 2013
Tipperary U-12 Hurling (C) Championship (1)
 2013

All-Ireland Medal Winners

All Ireland Senior:

- Donie Nealon (5) 1958, 1961, 1962, 1964 and 1965 
- Rody Nealon (1) 1924 
- Seán Nealon (1) 1991  
- Shane Maher (1) 2010 
- Donagh Maher (2) 2016, 2019 

Intermediate All-Ireland:

- J.P McDonnell (1) 1971 
- Pakie Hogan (1) 1971 
- Jim Barry (1) 1971  
- Kevin Nealon (1) 2000 
- Damien O'Brien (1) 2012

Junior All-Ireland:

- Sean Nealon (2) 1989, 1991 
- John Flannery (1) 1989 
- Paddy Hogan (1) 1924

U/21 All-Ireland:

- Liam McGrath (1) 1995

Minor All-Ireland:

- John Darcy (1) 1980 
- Tony Dunne (1) 2006 
- Donagh Maher (1) 2006
- Tony Dunne (1) 2006

Gaelic Football

Honours
North Tipperary Intermediate Football Championship (1)
 1989
North Tipperary Junior Football (A) Championship (1)
 1981
 Tipperary Junior B Football Championship (1)
 2000
North Tipperary Junior Football (B) Championship (1)
  2000
North Tipperary U-21 Football (A) Championship (2)
 2002, 2012
North Tipperary U-21 Football (A) Championship (1) *
 1971  * (As Naomh Padraig)
North Tipperary U-21 Football (B) Championship (3)
 1993, 2007, 2010
North Tipperary Minor Football (A) Championship (4)
 1985, 1999, 2006 (as Burgess Gaels), 2009
North Tipperary Minor Football (B) Championship (3)
 1985, 1991, 1994 (with Ballinahinch), 1997
North Tipperary U-16 Football (A) Championship (1)
 2004
North Tipperary U-16 Football (B) Championship (3)
 1994, 1997, 2007
North Tipperary U-14 Football (A) Championship (1)
 1999
North Tipperary U-14 Football (B) Championship (2)
 1988, 2009
North Tipperary U-12 Football (A) Championship (4)
 1995, 1996, 2000, 2004
North Tipperary U-12 Football (B) Championship (4)
 1992, 1994, 2001, 2018
North Tipperary U-12 Football (C) Championship (1)
 2013

References

External links
Tipperary GAA site
Official Burgess GAA Club website

Gaelic games clubs in County Tipperary
Hurling clubs in County Tipperary
Gaelic football clubs in County Tipperary